Birdsell is a surname. Notable people with the surname include:

 Bob Birdsell (born 1947), Canadian hockey player
 Joseph Birdsell (1908–1994), American anthropologist
 Regina Birdsell (born 1956), American politician
 Sandra Birdsell (born 1942), Canadian author

See also
 Birdsall (name)